Animoso was the name of at least three ships of the Italian Navy and may refer to:

 , an  launched in 1913 and discarded in 1923.
 , a  launched in 1942 and transferred to Russia under the designation Z 16 in 1949.
 , a  launched in 1989 as Animoso but she was renamed Luigi Durand de la Penne before completion.

Italian Navy ship names